Pernette is a French given name. Notable people with the name include:

Pernette Du Guillet
 (1915-2008), Swiss author
 (born 1967), Dutch fencer
Christine Etiennette Pernette Jurine
James Pernette deWolfe
Jeanne-Pernette Schenker-Massot
Christine Etiennette Pernette Jurine (1776–1812), Swiss scientific illustrator

See also

Pernette (surname)

French given names